Metro FC refers to a number of association football clubs:
Metro FC (Australia), based in Hobart, Australia
Metro FC (New Zealand), based in Auckland, New Zealand
Canberra FC, formerly Metro FC, a club in Canberra, Australia
Coquitlam Metro-Ford Soccer Club, based in Coquitlam, Canada
Persekam Metro FC, based in East Java, Indonesia

See also
Metrostars (disambiguation)